The 2021–22 Plymouth City Patriots season was the first season of the franchise and the team's first appearance in the British Basketball League (BBL). 

It was the first season under head coach Paul James.

Players

Squad information

Depth chart

Transactions

In

|}

Out

|}

Pre-season and friendlies

Friendly matches

Competitions

BBL Championship

Standings

Matches

BBL playoffs

Bracket

Quarter-Finals

BBL Cup

South Group

BBL Trophy

First round

Quarter-Finals

Statistics

BBL Championship

Source: British Basketball League

All Competitions

Statistics for all competitions including BBL Championship, BBL Cup, BBL Trophy and BBL Playoffs.

Source: BritHoops.com

References

External links
 

Plymouth City Patriots season